De La Salle may refer to:

 Saint Jean-Baptiste de la Salle (1651–1719), French Catholic priest and educational reformer
 Lasallian educational institutions, founded by the Institute of the Brothers of the Christian Schools, also known as the Lasallian Brothers

De La Salle may also refer to the following educational institutions:

 De La Salle Academy (disambiguation)
 De La Salle Brothers in the Philippines
 De La Salle Canlubang
 De La Salle College (disambiguation)
 De La Salle Collegiate High School in Warren, MI, USA
 De La Salle GAA
 De La Salle High School (disambiguation)
 De La Salle Institute
 De La Salle Lipa
 De La Salle Philippines
 De La Salle St Helens
 De La Salle-Santiago Zobel School, Alabang, Muntinlupa, Philippines
 De La Salle Supervised Schools
 De La Salle University, Manila, Philippines
 École secondaire publique De La Salle, Ottawa, Canada

See also
 La Salle (disambiguation)
 La Salle College Antipolo
 La Salle Green Hills
 De la Salle (Mexico City Metrobús), a BRT station in Mexico City